HMS Lossie was a River-class frigate that served in the Royal Navy from 1943 to 1946.

Construction

Lossie was ordered by the United States Navy as PG-103 and was built to the RN's specifications as a Group II River-class frigate.  She was laid down at Canadian Vickers Ltd., Montreal on 2 October 1942 and launched on 30 April 1943.  She was transferred on 12 August 1943 while still under construction from the USN to the RN under the auspices of the lend-lease program.

She was commissioned 2 days later into the RN as HMS Lossie and was named after the River Lossie in Moray, Scotland which flows into the Moray Firth at Lossiemouth.

War service

Lossie saw extensive service on North Atlantic convoy escort missions and also saw service in the Indian Ocean.

It was during a patrol mission in the Indian Ocean that the freighter Nellore was sunk on 29 June 1944.  Lossie picked up 112 crew from the Nellore the following week near the Chagos Archipelago and landed them at Addu Atoll.

Post-war use

Lossie was decommissioned and stricken from the RN on 26 January 1946 and was returned to the USN at Boston, Massachusetts two days later as PG-103.

The USN sold her on 13 November 1946 to Cadio Compania de Navegacio S.A. of Panama and she was registered as Teti.  She was sold in 1955 to Typaldos Brothers 88 Co. Ltd. of Piraeus, Greece and was registered as Adriatiki.  She was wrecked in the Aegean Sea on 16 January 1968.

References

Sources

1943 ships
River-class frigates of the Royal Navy